Lt Col (Weetman) John Churchill Pearson, 3rd Viscount Cowdray (27 February 1910 - 19 January 1995)  was a British peer, businessman and polo player.

Early life
Weetman John Churchill Pearson was born on 27 February 1910.

His father was Harold Pearson, 2nd Viscount Cowdray (1882–1933). His paternal grandfather was Weetman Pearson, 1st Viscount Cowdray (1856–1927).

His mother was Agnes Beryl Spencer-Churchill (1881–1948). His maternal great-grandfather was George Spencer-Churchill, 6th Duke of Marlborough (1793–1857).

He attended Eton College and graduated from Christ Church, Oxford.  He resided in Cowdray Park in Midhurst, West Sussex.

Career

Military career
He fought in the Second World War, and his left arm was amputated as a result. He received the Territorial Decoration (TD) for his service. He attained the rank of Lieutenant-Colonel from 1940 to 1941 in the British Home Guard. He served as Parliamentary Private Secretary to the Under-Secretary of State for Air, Harold Balfour, 1st Baron Balfour of Inchrye, from 1941 to 1942.

Deputy Lord Lieutenant
He served as Deputy Lieutenant (DL) of Sussex in 1945, during the tenure of Charles Wyndham, 3rd Baron Leconfield (1872–1952) as the Lord Lieutenant of Sussex, which spanned 1917 to 1949.

Business career
He served as Chairman of S. Pearson & Son Ltd from 1954 to 1977, and as President of Pearson PLC from 1983 to 1995.

Polo
When he went up to Oxford he played for four years with the Oxford polo team. In 1932 he captained the Oxford team which won the Tyro Cup, then still a Hurlingham tournament (now at Cowdray).

He was the main driving force for the revival of polo in England after the Second World War. He played polo despite having lost his arm at Dunkirk. He had an artificial limb fitted so he could continue to play.

In 1948 the In 1949, he played with the English team in the Argentinian Open. In 1951 he revived the Coronation Cup and in 1956 he launched his own major trophy, the Cowdray Park Gold Cup, which remains to this day the main trophy for British Open Polo.

He served as Steward and Chairman of the Hurlingham Polo Association from 1947 to 1967.

Marriages and children
Cowdray married Lady Anne Bridgeman (born 12 June 1913, died 21 May 2009), a daughter of Orlando Bridgeman, 5th Earl of Bradford, on 19 July 1939.  They had three children:

 Hon Mary Teresa Pearson (born 3 June 1940) married Lionel Stopford Sackville (1932–2013),
 Hon Liza Jane Pearson (born 30 March 1942), married Malcolm McNaughton
 Michael Orlando Weetman Pearson, 4th Viscount Cowdray (born 17 June 1944)
 
Viscount and Viscountess Cowdray divorced in 1950 and on 4 March 1953 Cowdray married Elizabeth Mather-Jackson, daughter of Sir Anthony Mather-Jackson, 6th Baronet. They also had three children:

 Hon Lucy Pearson (born 11 April 1954)
 Hon Charles Anthony Pearson (born 5 March 1956)
 Hon Rosanna Pearson (born 1 July 1959)

Cowdray died on 19 January 1995, at the age of eighty-four. Viscountess Cowdray died on 23 September 2011.

References

1910 births
1995 deaths
People from Midhurst
People educated at Eton College
Alumni of Christ Church, Oxford
John
Royalty and nobility with disabilities
3rd
English polo players
English amputees
Sportspeople from West Sussex
20th-century English businesspeople